was a district located in Gifu, Japan. On April 1, 2003 both towns and the village from the district merged, effectively turning the district into the city of Yamagata.

As of 2000, the district had an estimated population of 30,951 and a density of 139.4 persons per km2. The total area was 222 km2.

Former towns and villages
The towns and village formerly in the district, before merging into the city of Yamagata, were:
 Ijira
 Miyama
 Takatomi

References

Former districts of Gifu Prefecture